Güzelyurt is a district of Aksaray Province, Turkey.

Güzelyurt means "beautiful homeland" in Turkish and may also refer to:

Güzelyurt, Adıyaman, a village in the central district of Adıyaman Province, Turkey
Güzelyurt, Besni, a village in Besni district of Adıyaman Province, Turkey
Güzelyurt, Ardahan, a village in the central district of Ardahan Province, Turkey
Güzelyurt, Borçka, a village in Borçka district of Artvin Province, Turkey
Güzelyurt, Çameli
Güzelyurt, Çorum
Güzelyurt, Ergani
Güzelyurt, Mut, a village in Mut district of Mersin Province, Turkey
Güzelyurt, Palandöken
Güzelyurt (Northern Cyprus), a town in Northern Cyprus